Pavel Pinigin (born 12 March 1953) is a former Soviet wrestler and Olympic champion in Freestyle wrestling. He is also three times world champion in freestyle wrestling. He is married to athlete and Olympic champion Mariya Pinigina.

Olympics
Pinigin competed at the 1976 Summer Olympics in Montreal where he received a gold medal in Freestyle wrestling, the lightweight class.

References

External links

1953 births
Living people
Soviet male sport wrestlers
Olympic wrestlers of the Soviet Union
Wrestlers at the 1976 Summer Olympics
Wrestlers at the 1980 Summer Olympics
Russian male sport wrestlers
Olympic gold medalists for the Soviet Union
Olympic medalists in wrestling
World Wrestling Championships medalists
Medalists at the 1976 Summer Olympics
Yakut people
National University of Ukraine on Physical Education and Sport alumni
Sportspeople from Sakha
People from Yakutsk